Nukui Dam (温井ダム) is a dam in Akiota (former Kake), Hiroshima Prefecture, Japan. In Japan, it is the second highest arch dam, and it generates a powerful discharge from a height of 156 meters (500 liters per second).

References

Dams in Hiroshima Prefecture
Dams completed in 2001
Ōta River